Marvin Orlando Bejarano Jiménez (born March 6, 1988) is a Bolivian footballer who plays as a left wing back for The Strongest in Bolivian Primera División.

Club career
He has previously played for Unión Tarija, Universitario de Sucre and Oriente Petrolero. Bejarano began his career at 18 in the club of his hometown, Unión Tarija during the 2006 season. He stayed with them for a year before signing for Universitario de Sucre where he played for them for 4 seasons, from 2007 to 2011. During his time with Universitario de Sucre, he won his first title, winning the 2008 Bolivia championship. His good performances in the league and Copa Sudamericana 2010 increased his interest from other Bolivian clubs and ended up signing with Oriente Petrolero in 2011. During his first season with Oriente Petrolero, Polish club Wisła Krakow made an offer for Bejarano, which Bejarano accepted, however, unfortunately, the defender suffered a serious injury in training and chose to return to Bolivia causing the deal to fall through.

Universitario De Sucre 
Bejarano signed for Universitario De Sucre in 2007. He won the 2008 Bolivia Championship with them.

International career
He has been capped at international level by the Bolivia national team. He got his first call up for  the Bolivia National Team in 2009.

Career Statistics 
As of November 24 2019

Honours

Liga de Fútbol Profesional Boliviano: 2008 Apertura

References

External links

Marvin Bejarano at Soccerway

1988 births
Living people
People from Tarija
Bolivian footballers
Bolivia international footballers
Association football defenders
Bolivian Primera División players
Unión Tarija players
Universitario de Sucre footballers
Oriente Petrolero players
The Strongest players
2015 Copa América players
Copa América Centenario players
2019 Copa América players
Bolivia youth international footballers